"On My Mind" is a song performed by English production trio Disciples. The song was released in the United Kingdom as a digital download on 17 February 2017 through Parlophone and Warner Music Group. The song peaked at number 15 on the UK Singles Chart.

Music video
A music video to accompany the release of "On My Mind" was first released onto YouTube on 3 April 2017 at a total length of three minutes and twenty seconds.

Track listing

Charts

Weekly charts

Year-end charts

Certifications

Release history

References

2017 songs
2017 singles
Parlophone singles